Sara M. Gonzalez is an American politician. A Democrat, she formerly represented District 38 in the New York City Council, which comprises Sunset Park, Boerum Hill, Red Hook, Windsor Terrace, among other neighborhoods within the borough of Brooklyn. In 2013, Gonzalez was defeated for re-election in the Democratic primary by Carlos Menchaca; she left office on December 31, 2013.

In November 2002, Gonzalez was chosen in a special election to fill a seat vacated by former City Councilman Angel Rodriguez, who was forced to resign after pleading guilty to charges of bribery and extortion.

While in office, she was the chairwoman of the Juvenile Justice Committee on the Council. Gonzalez was formerly the chairwoman of Brooklyn Community Board 7 in Sunset Park, in addition to being the executive director of Hispanic Young People's Alternatives, which was a non-profit organization that offered after-school and tutorial programs to Hispanic youths.

Gonzalez is an alumna of College of Staten Island, and has attended Columbia School of Business Management.

References

External links
 Official NYC Council Website about Sara Gonzalez
Searchlight Council District 38
New York City Campaign Finance Board: The 2003 Voter Guides

New York City Council members
Hispanic and Latino American New York City Council members
Hispanic and Latino American women in politics
Columbia Business School alumni
New York (state) Democrats
Living people
College of Staten Island alumni
Women New York City Council members
Year of birth missing (living people)
21st-century American women